Calligonum leucocladum (many synonyms including Calligonum elegans) is a species of flowering plant in the family Polygonaceae. It is native to Central Asia (Kazakhstan, Kyrgyzstan, Tajikistan, Turkmenistan and Uzbekistan) and to Xinjiang in China. In Uzbekistan, it is limited to the Sokh River basin where it is endangered with a population fragmented by habitat loss from cutting and grazing.

References

leucocladum
Flora of Central Asia
Flora of Xinjiang
Plants described in 1941
Taxobox binomials not recognized by IUCN